Arbeh Langeh (also Romanized as Arbā Langeh) is a village in Machian Rural District, Kelachay District, Rudsar County, Gilan Province, Iran. At the 2006 census, its population was 132, in 33 families.

References 

Populated places in Rudsar County